In molecular biology, a carbohydrate-binding module (CBM) is a protein domain found in carbohydrate-active enzymes (for example glycoside hydrolases). The majority of these domains have carbohydrate-binding activity. Some of these domains are found on cellulosomal scaffoldin proteins. CBMs were previously known as cellulose-binding domains. CBMs are classified into numerous families, based on amino acid sequence similarity. There are currently (June 2011) 64 families of CBM in the CAZy database.

CBMs of microbial glycoside hydrolases play a central role in the recycling of photosynthetically fixed carbon through their binding to specific plant structural polysaccharides. CBMs can recognise both crystalline and amorphous cellulose forms. CBMs are the most common non-catalytic modules associated with enzymes active in plant cell-wall hydrolysis. Many putative CBMs have been identified by amino acid sequence alignments but only a few representatives have been shown experimentally to have a carbohydrate-binding function.

CBM1

Carbohydrate-binding module family 1 (CBM1) consists of 36 amino acids. This domain contains 4 conserved cysteine residues which are involved in the formation of two disulfide bonds.

CBM2

Carbohydrate-binding module family 2 (CBM2) contains two conserved cysteines - one at each extremity of the domain - which have been shown  to be involved in a disulfide bond. There are also four conserved tryptophans, two of which are involved in cellulose binding.

CBM3

Carbohydrate-binding module family 3 (CBM3) is involved in cellulose binding  and is found associated with a wide range of bacterial glycosyl hydrolases. The structure of this domain is known; it forms a beta sandwich.

CBM4

Carbohydrate-binding module family 4 (CBM4) includes the two cellulose-binding domains, CBD(N1) and CBD(N2), arranged in tandem at the N terminus of the 1,4-beta-glucanase, CenC, from Cellulomonas fimi. These  homologous CBMs are distinct in their selectivity for binding amorphous and not crystalline cellulose. Multidimensional heteronuclear nuclear magnetic resonance (NMR) spectroscopy was used to determine the tertiary structure of the 152 amino acid N-terminal cellulose-binding domain from C. fimi 1,4-beta-glucanase CenC (CBDN1). The tertiary structure of CBDN1 is strikingly similar to that of the bacterial 1,3-1,4-beta-glucanases, as well as other sugar-binding proteins with jelly-roll folds. CBM4 and CBM9 are closely related.

CBM5

Carbohydrate-binding module family 5 (CBM5) binds chitin. CBM5 and CBM12 are distantly related.

CBM6

Carbohydrate-binding module family 6 (CBM6) is unusual in that it contains two substrate-binding sites, cleft A and cleft B. Cellvibrio mixtus endoglucanase 5A contains two CBM6 domains, the CBM6 domain at the C-terminus displays distinct ligand binding specificities in each of the substrate-binding clefts. Both cleft A and cleft B can bind cello-oligosaccharides, laminarin preferentially binds in cleft A, xylooligosaccharides only bind in cleft A and beta1,4,-beta1,3-mixed linked glucans only bind in cleft B.

CBM9

Carbohydrate-binding module family 9 (CBM9) binds to crystalline cellulose. CBM4 and CBM9 are closely related.

CBM10

Carbohydrate-binding module family 10 (CBM10) is found in two distinct sets of proteins with different functions. Those found in aerobic bacteria bind cellulose (or other carbohydrates); but in anaerobic fungi they are protein binding domains, referred to as dockerin domains. The dockerin domains are believed to be responsible for the assembly of a multiprotein cellulase/hemicellulase complex, similar to the cellulosome found in certain anaerobic bacteria.

In anaerobic bacteria that degrade plant cell walls, exemplified by Clostridium thermocellum, the dockerin domains of the catalytic polypeptides can bind equally well to any cohesin from the same organism. More recently, anaerobic fungi, typified by Piromyces equi, have been suggested to also synthesise a cellulosome complex, although the dockerin sequences of the bacterial and fungal enzymes are completely different. For example, the fungal enzymes contain one, two or three copies of the dockerin sequence in tandem within the catalytic polypeptide. In contrast, all the C. thermocellum cellulosome catalytic components contain a single dockerin domain. The anaerobic bacterial dockerins are homologous to EF hands (calcium-binding motifs) and require calcium for activity whereas the fungal dockerin does not require calcium. Finally, the interaction between cohesin and dockerin appears to be species specific in bacteria, there is almost no species specificity of binding within fungal species and no identified sites that distinguish different species.

The of dockerin from P. equi contains two helical stretches and four short beta-strands which form an antiparallel sheet structure adjacent to an additional short twisted parallel strand. The N- and C-termini are adjacent to each other.

CBM11

Carbohydrate-binding module family 11 (CBM11) is found in a number of bacterial cellulases. One example is the CBM11 of Clostridium thermocellum Cel26A-Cel5E, this domain has been shown to bind both β-1,4-glucan and β-1,3-1,4-mixed linked glucans. CBM11 has beta-sandwich structure with a concave side forming a substrate-binding cleft.

CBM12

Carbohydrate-binding module family 12 (CBM12) comprises two beta-sheets, consisting of two and three antiparallel beta strands respectively. It binds chitin via the aromatic rings of tryptophan residues. CBM5 and CBM12 are distantly related.

CBM14

Carbohydrate-binding module family 14 (CBM14) is also known as the peritrophin-A domain. It is found in chitin binding proteins, particularly the peritrophic matrix proteins of insects and animal chitinases. Copies of the domain are also found in some baculoviruses. It is an extracellular domain that contains six conserved cysteines that probably form three disulfide bridges. Chitin binding has been demonstrated for a protein containing only two of these domains.

CBM15

Carbohydrate-binding module family 15 (CBM15), found in bacterial enzymes, has been shown to bind to xylan and xylooligosaccharides. It has a beta-jelly roll fold, with a groove on the concave surface of one of the beta-sheets.

CBM17

Carbohydrate-binding module family 17 (CBM17) appears to have a very shallow binding cleft that may be more accessible to cellulose chains in non-crystalline cellulose than the deeper binding clefts of family 4 CBMs. Sequence and structural conservation in families CBM17 and CBM28 suggests that they have evolved through gene duplication and subsequent divergence. CBM17 does not compete with CBM28 modules when binding to non-crystalline cellulose. Different CBMs have been shown to bind to different sites in amorphous cellulose, CBM17 and CBM28 recognise distinct non-overlapping sites in amorphous cellulose.

CBM18

Carbohydrate-binding module family 18 (CBM18) (also known as chitin binding 1 or chitin recognition protein) is found in a number of plant and fungal proteins that bind N-acetylglucosamine (e.g. solanaceous lectins of tomato and potato, plant endochitinases, the wound-induced proteins: hevein, win1 and win2, and the Kluyveromyces lactis killer toxin alpha subunit). The domain may occur in one or more copies and is thought to be involved in recognition or binding of chitin subunits. In chitinases, as well as in the potato wound-induced proteins, this 43-residue domain directly follows the signal sequence and is therefore at the N terminus of the mature protein; in the killer toxin alpha subunit it is located in the central section of the protein.

CBM19

Carbohydrate-binding module family 19 (CBM19), found in fungal chitinases, binds chitin.

CBM20

Carbohydrate-binding module family 20 (CBM20) binds to starch.

CBM21

Carbohydrate-binding module family 21 (CBM21), found in many eukaryotic proteins involved in glycogen metabolism, binds to glycogen.

CBM25

Carbohydrate-binding module family 25 (CBM25) binds alpha-glucooligosaccharides, particularly those containing alpha-1,6 linkages, and granular starch.

CBM27

Carbohydrate-binding module family 27 (CBM27) binds to beta-1,4-mannooligosaccharides, carob galactomannan, and konjac glucomannan, but not to cellulose (insoluble and soluble) or soluble birchwood xylan. CBM27 adopts a beta sandwich structure comprising 13 beta strands with a single, small alpha-helix and a single metal atom.

CBM28

Carbohydrate-binding module family 28 (CBM28) does not compete with CBM17 modules when binding to non-crystalline cellulose. Different CBMs have been shown to bind to different sirtes in amorphous cellulose, CBM17 and CBM28 recognise distinct non-overlapping sites in amorphous cellulose. CBM28 has a "beta-jelly roll" topology, which is similar in structure to the CBM17 domains. Sequence and structural conservation in families CBM17 and CBM28 suggests that they have evolved through gene duplication and subsequent divergence.

CBM32

Carbohydrate-binding module family 32 (CBM32) binds to diverse substrates, ranging from plant cell wall polysaccharides to complex glycans. The module has so far been found in microorganisms, including archea, eubacteria and fungi. CBM32 adopts a beta-sandwich fold and has a bound metal atom, most often observed to be calcium. CBM32 modules are associated with catalytic modules such as sialidases, B-N-acetylglucosaminidases, α-N-acetylglucosaminidases, mannanases and galactose oxidases.

CBM33

Carbohydrate-binding module family 33 (CBM33) is a chitin-binding domain. It has a budded fibronectin type III fold consisting of two beta-sheets, arranged as a beta-sheet sandwich and a bud consisting of three short helices, located between beta-strands 1 and 2. It binds chitin via conserved polar amino acids. This domain is found in isolation in baculoviral spheroidin and spindolin proteins.

CBM48

Carbohydrate-binding module family 48 (CBM48) is often found in enzymes containing glycosyl hydrolase family 13 catalytic domains. It is found in a range of enzymes that act on branched substrates i.e. isoamylase, pullulanase and branching enzyme. Isoamylase hydrolyses 1,6-alpha-D-glucosidic branch linkages in glycogen, amylopectin and dextrin; 1,4-alpha-glucan branching enzyme functions in the formation of 1,6-glucosidic linkages of glycogen; and pullulanase is a starch-debranching enzyme. CBM48 binds glycogen.

CBM49

Carbohydrate-binding module family 49 (CBM49) is found at the C-terminal of cellulases and in vitro binding studies have shown it to binds to crystalline cellulose.

References

External links
 CAZy Carbohydrate binding modules

Protein domains